The First Federal Electoral District of Aguascalientes (I Distrito Electoral Federal de Aguascalientes) is one of the 300 Electoral Districts into which Mexico is divided for the purpose of elections to the federal Chamber of Deputies and one of three such districts in the state of Aguascalientes.

It elects one deputy to the lower house of Congress for each three-year legislative period, by means of the first past the post system.

District territory
Under the 2005 redistricting process, the First District of Aguascalientes is made up of the municipalities of Cosío, Rincón de Romos, Tepezalá, Asientos, Pabellón de Arteaga, San José de Gracia, Jesús María, San Francisco de los Romo, Calvillo, and El Llano.

The district's head town (cabecera distrital), where results from individual polling stations are gathered together and collated, is the city of Jesús María, Aguascalientes.

Previous districting schemes

1996–2005 district
The electoral district was composed of the same municipalities under the 1996–2005 districting scheme.

Deputies returned to Congress from this district

References 

Federal electoral districts of Mexico
Aguascalientes